The 1988 Lion Brown New Zealand Masters was a professional invitational snooker tournament which took place between 22 and 26 May 1988 at the Legislative Chamber of the New Zealand Parliament in  Wellington, New Zealand.

Stephen Hendry won the tournament beating Mike Hallett 6–1 in the final.

Main draw

Third place match:  Joe Johnson 5–4 Tony Knowles

References

New Zealand Masters (snooker)
1988 in snooker
1988 in New Zealand sport
July 1988 sports events in New Zealand